Lefevrea humeralis is a species of leaf beetle. It is distributed in the Democratic Republic of the Congo, the Central African Republic, Uganda and Sudan. It was described by Julius Weise in 1924.

References 

Eumolpinae
Beetles of the Democratic Republic of the Congo
Insects of the Central African Republic
Insects of Uganda
Insects of Sudan
Taxa named by Julius Weise
Beetles described in 1924